Joseph Francis Civello (February 3, 1902 – January 17, 1970) was an American mobster and the leader of the Dallas crime family from 1956 until his death in 1970.

Early life
A native of Baton Rouge, Louisiana, Civello had moved to Dallas as early as July 1928 when he was arrested for the murder of Joe DeCarlo at the St. Paul Drug Store in Dallas. Reportedly, DeCarlo's dying words were that the close-range shotgun blast to his abdomen was accidental. Based on this information, a grand jury did not issue an indictment against Civello. Civello was an expert marksman and regularly participated in skeet shooting competitions as a longtime member of the Dallas Gun and Skeet Club.

By the early 1930s, Civello had organized a crew (dubbed The Civello Gang by the Dallas Morning News) which included cousins Sam Civello, Louis Civello, Leon Civello, Frank Ianni, and Joe Cascio, among others. The gang operated as associates of Dallas' Piranio crime family, and was involved primarily with bootlegging and narcotics trafficking.

The Civello gang's main rival during this time was a Jewish gang headed by Nathan Biegler. In 1935, when Biegler was sentenced to 10 years in Leavenworth Federal Penitentiary, another Jewish gangster, Louis "Big Daddy" Ginsberg, came to Dallas from Chicago to reorganize the remnants of Biegler's gang. Both the Civello Gang and the Ginsberg Gang were heavily involved in the sale and distribution of morphine and heroin. The Civellos collaborated almost exclusively with associates of Charles "Lucky" Luciano of New York City, while the Ginsbergs' drugs came from mobsters in Chicago.

In January 1937, after a two-year undercover investigation, federal agents seized more than $150,000 of drugs and arrested members of both the Civello and Ginsberg gangs. It was called the biggest narcotics bust in Bureau of Narcotics history. Ginsberg was sentenced to 50 years in federal prison which, at the time, was the longest sentence ever given for a drug crime in the United States. Civello was sentenced to 15 years in Leavenworth, and five others of the Civello gang were given lesser sentences.

Rise to power
After his release, Civello resumed his organized criminal activities in Dallas and quickly moved up within the Piranio family ranks. From its beginning, the Piranio crime family was a traditional mafia organization, taking care to avoid unnecessary attention from the press and law enforcement. In fact, when family boss Joseph Piranio died at age 78, his obituary described him as a successful retired building contractor and family man; no mention was made of any involvement in the underworld. The low-key nature of the Dallas mob quickly changed once Civello assumed the reins as boss upon Piranio's death in 1956.

Apalachin meeting

One year after Civello ascended to power, he made a fateful trip that would shed a glaring light on him and La Cosa Nostra in Dallas for years to come. Following the assassination of Albert Anastasia, chief of one of the Five Families of New York, a meeting of mob leaders from cities throughout the United States and Canada was called in order to install Carlo Gambino as Anastasia's successor. A suspiciously large number of black Cadillacs and Lincolns in and around Apalachin, New York, the tiny Upstate New York town where the mob conference was gathering, alerted local law enforcement to investigate. Over 60 underworld bosses were detained and indicted at the Apalachin Meeting, including Civello. Noted federal judge Irving R. Kaufman presided over the 1960 trial in which Civello was sentenced to five years for a conspiracy charge stemming from the Apalachin meeting. Civello retained Houston defense attorney Percy Foreman, and the conviction was reversed on appeal in 1961.

Despite his attendance at the Apalachin meeting, a report filed in February 1962 by the FBI's Dallas field office stated: "There is no evidence of illegal activity by Joseph Civello."

Underworld connections

Joseph Civello was related to:
 Frank DeSimone, boss of the Los Angeles crime family
 Antonio Musso, boss of the Rockford, Illinois, crime family
 James and Vincenzo Coletti, bosses of the Colorado crime family

Civello was a close friend or associate of these powerful people
 Benny Binion, gangster, poker enthusiast, and casino owner
 Giovanni Ormento, capo in the New York Lucchese crime family
 Jimmy "The Hat" Lanza, boss of the San Francisco crime family
 Santo Trafficante Jr., boss of the Tampa crime family in Florida
 Carlos Marcello, boss of the New Orleans crime family

Civello-Marcello connection
It has often been erroneously reported that the Dallas crime family was merely a satellite operation of Carlos Marcello's New Orleans crime family. While the flashier, more powerful New Orleans mob certainly collaborated extensively with the Dallas mob, it did not control the Dallas mob. They were two separate, distinctive entities; Marcello was careful not to step on the toes of the Dallas family (at least prior to Civello's death in 1970). Additionally, Marcello was only 11 years old when the Piranio crime family was officially founded in 1910.

In its investigation of the assassination of John F. Kennedy, the House Select Committee on Assassinations said that it recognized Jack Ruby's murder of Lee Harvey Oswald as a primary reason to suspect organized crime as possibly having involvement in the assassination. In its investigation of Ruby to determine if he was involved in criminal activities and if that involvement was related to the killing of Oswald, the HSCA noted that Ruby was a "personal acquaintance" of Civello and that Civello was an associate of Marcello. The Committee reported that "Oswald and Ruby showed a variety of relationships that may have matured into an assassination conspiracy" but that it "was unable firmly to identify the other gunman or the nature and extent" of a conspiracy involving organized crime.

Final days
Civello's racketeering continued, as did his expansion into legitimate businesses. Judge Irving R. Kaufman called Civello a "high ranking criminal who cloaked himself with the facade of legitimate business."

Civello died on January 17, 1970, in Dallas of natural causes. His obituary indicated no children, but listed a wife, a brother and five sisters as survivors. He was buried at Calvary Hill Cemetery in Dallas.

References

1902 births
1970 deaths
American crime bosses
American gangsters of Italian descent
Criminals from Texas
People from Dallas